Six Degrees (or 6˚, stylized as ) is an American serial drama television series about six residents of New York City and their respective relationships and connections with one another, based on the idea of six degrees of separation.

It premiered on September 21, 2006, after Grey's Anatomy on ABC. The show was created by Raven Metzner and Stuart Zicherman. J. J. Abrams, Bryan Burk and Thom Sherman serve as executive producers through their Bad Robot Productions banner. The pilot episode was directed by Rodrigo García. It is filmed on location in Manhattan and at Silvercup Studios in Long Island City, Queens, New York. The show's theme song, "Here Comes Now", was written and performed by Jakob Dylan.

The series was shown in Canada on Global on Wednesday evenings prior to the American airings.  It was due to air in early 2007 on ITV in the UK but didn't after it was cancelled by ABC. It finally made its debut on ITV on May 28, 2008 where all thirteen episodes were aired.

On November 8, 2006, Six Degrees was pulled off the schedule by ABC due to a decrease in ratings.  By January 2007, ABC had not ordered any more episodes to be produced for the season.

The series returned on March 23, 2007, with its seventh episode in a new timeslot at 9:00pm EDT on Fridays and with Josh Charles added to the cast.  After just two weeks back on the air, the series was pulled by ABC for a second time due to poor ratings, on April 2, 2007, further fueling doubts of the series continuing. On April 27, 2007, the unaired ninth episode was posted on ABC's website, with the last four weekly after.

On May 15, 2007, the series was canceled by ABC. In June 2007, ABC's programming calendar available to the media indicated the final episodes of the series would be broadcast beginning Friday, August 10, 2007; however, ABC decided instead to air repeats of another show.

Cast and characters 

 Jay Hernandez as Carlos Green, a struggling defense attorney who lets his feelings for Mae interfere with his job. He becomes friends with Damian after helping him out in a fight.
 Erika Christensen as Mae Anderson, a young woman attempting to start life over in New York City; gets a job as Laura's nanny. She has a mysterious box that contains "personal belongings", and refuses to let anyone see its contents.  It is revealed in the episode "Masquerade" that at age 15, she was caught in an abusive relationship, which her brother Eric helped her out of by either assaulting or killing the man.  Eric was wanted by the police for doing so.
 Hope Davis as Laura Morgan, a widow whose husband (played by Robert John Burke) was killed while working as an embedded journalist during the war in Iraq. She meets Whitney in a nail salon and the two become fast friends. However, Whitney's fiancé hits on Laura during Whitney's bridal shower.  Laura is conflicted about revealing this to Whitney, who becomes angry and does not accept it until it becomes very clear that he has been cheating on her. Laura tries to move on with her life by getting a job as an assistant to an interior designer.
 Dorian Missick as Damian Henry, a gambling addict trying to lead a normal life by honestly earning his money as a limousine driver. He once was heavily involved in criminal activity, and his brother (one of his old partners-in-crime), continues to try to bring him back to a life of crime. His brother asks him to find a runaway that some friends are looking for, he is handed a picture of her not knowing the girl is Mae.  He later finds out that this is Mae, and tells Carlos that bad people are looking for Mae, resulting in Carlos persuading Mae to let him help her.
 Bridget Moynahan as Whitney Crane, a Public Relations executive who is looking forward to marriage. She was unaware of the fact that her fiancé has been dating other women. She initially suspected him of it although he wrongly convinced her otherwise.  However, later on, after her fiancé is punched by "The Puncher" and it is revealed that the men who Puncher hits are the men that have slept with the Puncher's wife, Whitney realizes that her fiancé has been cheating on her. She breaks it off and tries to deal with the fallout of the relationship by throwing herself into her career.
 Campbell Scott as Steven Caseman, a separated father who was believed by many to be dead when he ran off to Mexico. He took a picture of Laura crying (outdoors and without her knowledge) over the death of her husband, which helped bring him back to his old career in photography.  Steven is struggling to persuade his wife to allow him to have more contact with their son Max; however, his wife does not trust Steven, since he once lost Max, and also disappeared for four months. His girlfriend, Anya (whom he met through Whitney) is roommates with Carlos.

Episodes

References

External links 
 

2000s American drama television series
2006 American television series debuts
2007 American television series endings
American Broadcasting Company original programming
Television series by Bad Robot Productions
English-language television shows
Serial drama television series
Television series by ABC Studios
Television shows set in New York City